Bad Wolves is an American heavy metal band formed in 2017. Initially finding fame from their first single, a cover of the Cranberries' 1994 hit "Zombie", the band proceeded to find further success with a number of songs topping the Billboard Mainstream Rock songs chart, including "Remember When", "Killing Me Slowly", and "Sober". The band has released three studio albums, Disobey (2018), N.A.T.I.O.N. (2019) and Dear Monsters (2021). In January 2021, original lead vocalist Tommy Vext left the band and was replaced by Daniel "DL" Laskiewicz. Tensions ensued between Vext and the band, resulting in legal proceedings including Better Noise Music.

History

Formation and Disobey (2017–2019)
In July 2014, Boecklin started writing the music that would become the band's debut album and during 2016 entered AudioHammer Studios in Sanford, Florida, with producer Mark Lewis.

Bad Wolves was founded in 2017 by drummer John Boecklin (ex-DevilDriver), vocalist Tommy Vext (ex-Divine Heresy, ex-Westfield Massacre), lead guitarist Doc Coyle (ex-God Forbid), rhythm guitarist Chris Cain (ex-Bury Your Dead, ex-For the Fallen Dreams), and bassist Kyle Konkiel (ex-In This Moment, ex-Scar the Martyr, Vimic). They are managed by Zoltan Bathory of Five Finger Death Punch. The band announced that they would release their debut studio album, Disobey, on May 11, 2018. Of the thirteen songs in Disobey, ten were written and recorded before Vext joined the band.

In May 2017, Bad Wolves released their debut single, "Learn to Live". In November 2017, Bad Wolves released their second single, "Toast to the Ghost". On Christmas Eve 2017, the Cranberries' singer Dolores O'Riordan left a text message to her friend, Managing Director of E7LG-Europe, Dan Waite, where she offered to "sing on it", on the cover of "Zombie" that Waite had previously given her to listen to and accredit.

On January 15, 2018, O'Riordan — who was in London for a recording session for her side project's second album, left a voice message to Waite during that night, where she asked him to come in the studio later that morning, and to listen to her vocals on the cover of Bad Wolves. O'Riordan died prior to recording it. On January 18, 2018, they released a third single, which was the cover of "Zombie" (originally by the Cranberries), which charted on multiple Billboard charts. The song peaked at number 23 on the Billboard 200, and reached number 9 in Australia. It topped the US Billboard Mainstream Rock chart. A music video was released on February 22. The band toured with Five Finger Death Punch, Shinedown, Breaking Benjamin, and Starset in the first half of 2018. In October 2018, the band launched a crowdfunding campaign to create a documentary about their formation and rise to fame. The film would be called "Breaking the Band". By the end of the campaign, they had raised under $15,000 of their $65,000 target. Despite this, the band received all the donated money and still intend to create something for the project.

Since their inception, the band has shared the stage with the likes of Five Finger Death Punch, Nickelback, Shinedown, Breaking Benjamin, Papa Roach and Nothing More. They also had their cover of "Zombie" nominated for the iHeartRadio's Rock Song of the Year.

N.A.T.I.O.N. and departure of Tommy Vext (2019–2021)

On July 26, 2019, the band released a new single titled "I'll Be There", followed by another single titled "Killing Me Slowly", a third single titled "Sober", as well as a fourth single titled "Crying Game" and announced their new album, N.A.T.I.O.N., which was released on October 25, 2019. "Killing Me Slowly" was a song written in collaboration with outside songwriters; however, Vext would later state publicly that he was "the mastermind behind the song" after changing a few lyrics.

Two unreleased singles were released on April 10 on Patreon. The two singles include a cover of "Heart Shaped Box" by Nirvana and a new song called "Shanghai".

In an interview in October 2020, vocalist Vext confirmed that the band had almost completed their third full-length album and that they may release it six months early exclusively via Patreon.

On January 8, 2021, Vext announced his departure from Bad Wolves, with intention to launch his own solo career. On January 9, the band released an official statement saying: "It is true that Bad Wolves and vocalist Tommy Vext have parted ways. The four of us plan to continue making music and a new album is planned for later this year. Tommy has been a big part of Bad Wolves and we are grateful for his contributions".  This followed a context in which his support for Donald Trump was criticized, as well as his belief in conspiracy theories stating that Black Lives Matter was "created" by George Soros, the Clinton Foundation, and the media; he also said: "I have not experienced actual racism; it's all manufactured". Previously, Vext was accused of domestic violence by his former girlfriend Whitney Johns. He stated that he was incited to leave Bad Wolves by the four remaining musicians and the label, Better Noise Music, "over his conservative political views".

Hiring of Daniel "DL" Laskiewicz, Dear Monsters, and departure of Chris Cain (2021–present)
On May 25, 2021, Tommy Vext claimed via his official Facebook account that Daniel "DL" Laskiewicz (former guitarist of The Acacia Strain) had joined Bad Wolves as their new lead vocalist. Vext followed this up by claiming that "the band is going to have to change its name if they don't pay for the songs I wrote and my trademark ownership but either way wish this dude the best I guess." The band did not respond to Vext's claims at the time. Just over a week later on June 2, 2021, Bad Wolves announced that Laskiewicz had indeed joined the band and that they were working on their third album called Dear Monsters, which they claimed would be "the best Bad Wolves album to date". The band also elaborated further on Vext's departure, saying that they "disagree with the validity of much of what he has said publicly about our parting of ways – but we would prefer to not look back on the past and instead focus on this new chapter. And most importantly, we'd like to let the music speak for itself." Laskiewicz was involved in the songwriting of N.A.T.I.O.N.

In July 2021, Doc Coyle stated on an episode of his podcast The Ex-Man with Doc Coyle that Vext's continued pressure against Bad Wolves meant that "a big portion of the fanbase has essentially been radicalized against the band under false pretenses." This came in the wake of a lawsuit filed by Vext against Bad Wolves manager Allen Kovac, who is also the CEO of Better Noise Music. In the lawsuit, Vext alleged that Kovac attempted to stop him from making political statements, attempted to buy the trademarks for Bad Wolves off him, tried to strong-arm radio and streaming services into not playing Bad Wolves when Vext refused to sell him the trademarks as a way of pushing Vext out of the music industry, and repeatedly using racial slurs to belittle him. Kovac responded with a statement of his own saying that Vext's accusations were "categorically false". Coyle and John Boecklin also made their own statement where they said that "In all our dealings with Allen Kovac, he has never used any derogatory racial slurs. Tommy is making all of this up. Period."

In late August 2021, Better Noise Music sued Vext for "copyright infringement, breach of contract and unjust enrichment".

The band released the first single from Dear Monsters, "Lifeline", on September 8. The album was released on October 29, 2021. Vext started a tour starting September 10 and billed himself with his solo band under "Tommy Vext and The B@D W8LV3S". On September 9, 2021, in a statement directed toward Vext, Bad Wolves wrote that "desperate people do desperate things", citing that Vext "can't write his own music" and that he had edited a version of the band's single, "Lifeline", with his singing voice on it that he circulated on the Internet. Bad Wolves cited initiatives Vext has taken since leaving the band in January 2021, including his GoFundMe, which was later shut down for fraud because he attempted to "dupe fans" by inciting them to buy an album of covers to which he does not hold the rights. Bad Wolves described Vext as "abusive − both emotionally and physically" while he was in the band and then afterward when he left it. The band also mentioned his "never-ending temper tantrums" on social media "filled with fraudulent claims and sad attempts to defame members of our band and our team". They said Vext had spread "mountains of lies", that he has "no moral compass", and is willing to do anything to achieve his ends. Vext did not respond directly to Bad Wolves but posted a clip from Avengers: Endgame on his social media, which summed up his sentiment.

On April 14, 2022, guitarist Chris Cain announced his departure from the band via Instagram. The following month, it was announced that Max Karon (of Once Human) had joined Bad Wolves as their new rhythm guitarist. Karon had previously worked with Bad Wolves on their first three albums. On July 28, the band released an EP titled Sacred Kiss.

Band members

Current members
 Doc Coyle – lead guitar, backing vocals 
 Kyle Konkiel – bass, backing vocals 
 John Boecklin – drums, percussion 
 Daniel "DL" Laskiewicz – lead vocals 
 Max Karon – rhythm guitar

Former members 
 Tommy Vext – lead vocals 
 Chris Cain – rhythm guitar 

Timeline

Discography

Studio albums

 Disobey (2018)
 N.A.T.I.O.N. (2019)
 Dear Monsters (2021)

References

External links

 
 
 The Ex-Man with Doc Coyle

2017 establishments in California
American groove metal musical groups
Djent
Hard rock musical groups from California
Heavy metal musical groups from California
Musical groups established in 2017